Luis Diego Cordero Jiménez (born May 21, 1988) is a Costa Rican football midfielder currently playing for Primera División club C.S. Herediano.

Club career
Cordero started his career at Deportivo Saprissa and joined Herediano in January 2014.

International career
Cordero played at the 2005 FIFA U-17 World Championship held in Peru. He made his senior debut for Costa Rica in a March 2012 friendly match against Jamaica.

References

External links
 
 Luis Diego Cordero statistics at nacion.com

1988 births
Living people
People from Alajuela
Association football midfielders
Costa Rican footballers
Costa Rica international footballers
Deportivo Saprissa players
C.S. Herediano footballers